Kucinski or Kuciński (feminine: Kucińska; plural: Kucińscy) is a Polish surname. Notable people with the surname include:

 Benjamin Kuciński (born 1982), Polish race walker
 Bernardo Kucinski (born 1937), Brazilian journalist and political scientist
 Ewa Kucińska (born 1962), Polish diver

See also
 
 Kuczynski

Polish-language surnames